Samuel James Harrison (born 24 June 1992) is a Welsh racing cyclist. He has twice won medals at the UCI Track Cycling World Championships, in 2011, and 2013.

Cycling career
Harrison is from Risca, Newport. He tried cycling after hearing his friends saying that Newport Velodrome was fun, and at the age of 13 he was soon racing with the local club, Cwmcarn Paragon. He was selected to be a member of British Cycling's Olympic Development Programme in 2008.

Harrison was nominated for the BBC's Young Sports Personality award in 2008, after winning three titles in the youth competition of the British National Track Championships. In February 2009, he was selected to represent Great Britain at the UCI Cyclo-cross World Championships. He also won two medals at the Under-23 European Track Championships.

2011 saw Harrison break-through at a senior level. He won his first competition at the UCI Track World Cup event in Beijing, winning the omnium. The first appearance for Harrison at the UCI World Track Championships came in 2011, in which he won a bronze medal as part of the Team Pursuit. He was selected in the final after regular starter Ed Clancy fell ill. Harrison also finished 11th in the omnium.

Harrison was left out of the Team GB squad for the 2012 World Championships and 2012 Olympic Games after more experienced riders returned to the team. He won the under-23 title at the British National Time Trial Championships. 2013 saw Harrison return to the British squad for the World Championships, in which he formed part of the silver medal winning Team Pursuit team. Harrison signed for the  team for the 2014 season.

Harrison represented Wales at the Commonwealth Games in Glasgow, 2014.

He was named as a member of the  team for the 2016 season.

Major results

2009
 1st  Team pursuit, National Track Championships
 UEC European Junior Track Championships
2nd  Team pursuit
3rd  Madison
 2nd Overall Junior Tour of Wales
2010
 UCI Junior Track World Championships
2nd  Omnium
2nd  Team pursuit
 National Track Championships
2nd  Madison
3rd  Individual pursuit
 2nd Overall Junior Tour of Wales
 7th Paris–Roubaix Juniors
2011
 1st  Omnium – Beijing, UCI Track World Cup
 National Track Championships
2nd  Individual pursuit
3rd  Kilo
 2nd  Team pursuit, UEC European Under–23 Track Championships
 3rd  Team pursuit, UCI Track World Championships
2012
 1st  Time trial, National Under–23 Road Championships
2013
 1st  Time trial, National Under–23 Road Championships
 2nd  Team pursuit, UCI Track World Championships
 National Track Championships
1st  Scratch race
2nd  Points race
 1st  Team pursuit, UEC European Track Championships
2014
 2nd  Team pursuit, National Track Championships
2016
 3rd  Omnium – Glasgow, UCI Track World Cup

Personal life
Harrison attended Coleg Gwent at Crosskeys. Six of Harrison's bicycles were stolen from his family home in June 2009. They were valued at approximately £12,000 and included a bright pink Planet-X team issue bike unavailable in the shops.

References

External links

1992 births
Living people
Welsh male cyclists
Cyclists at the 2010 Commonwealth Games
Cyclists at the 2014 Commonwealth Games
People educated at Hurtwood House
People from Risca
Sportspeople from Caerphilly County Borough
Sportspeople from Newport, Wales
Commonwealth Games competitors for Wales